Henry Thomas "Harry" Blackstaffe (28 July 1868 – 22 August  1951) was a British rower who competed in the 1908 Summer Olympics.

Blackstaffe was born in Islington,  London, and became a butcher. He was a long-standing member of Vesta Rowing Club in Putney and also a cross-country runner who represented South London Harriers in the National Championships. As a single sculler he won nine victories in the London Cup at the Metropolitan Regatta. He first won the Wingfield Sculls in 1897 but in 1898, 1899 and 1900 was beaten by Benjamin Hunting Howell. He won again in  1901 defeating Saint-George Ashe and Arthur Cloutte. He lost to Cloutte in 1902 and to Ashe in 1904, but beat them both in 1905 and 1906. At first he had difficulty in having his entry accepted for Henley Royal Regatta but competed in the 
Diamond Challenge Sculls in  1905 when he lost to Frederick Septimus Kelly. In 1906 he won the Diamond Sculls beating Captain Darell. In 1908 he won the Wingfield Sculls again and his ninth London Cup, but his major success was to win the gold medal in the single sculls, rowing at the 1908 Summer Olympics. He was aged forty and his opponent in the final Alexander McCulloch was exactly half his age and had won Diamonds that year. The final was considered the finest race of the Olympic Regatta  and was virtually level until the last 50 yards when Blackstaffe held on to a light advantage to become the oldest sculling champion in Olympic history.

After this  victory, Blackstaffe retired and was made a Freeman of the City of London. He was later senior life vice-president of the Amateur Rowing Association. He died at West Wickham, aged 83.

References

External links
profile

1868 births
1951 deaths
English male rowers
English Olympic medallists
British male rowers
Olympic rowers of Great Britain
Rowers at the 1908 Summer Olympics
Olympic gold medallists for Great Britain
Olympic medalists in rowing
Medalists at the 1908 Summer Olympics